Pellegrino Ghigi (29 November 1899 – 1995) was an Italian diplomat.

Career 
Ghigi was ambassador of Italy to Egypt (1935 – June 1936), Romania (1938–1941) and Spain (25 July 1958 – 5 May 1961). He was also Italian plenipotentiary in occupied Greece (1941–1943).

Honors
 Order of Merit of the Italian Republic 1st Class / Knight Grand Cross – 2 June 1955

See also 
 Ministry of Foreign Affairs (Italy)
 Foreign relations of Italy

References

Bibliography
 Friedrich Christof: Befriedung im Donauraum. Der Zweite Wiener Schiedsspruch und die deutsch-ungarischen diplomatischen Beziehungen 1939–1942. Frankfurt am Main : Lang, 1998

1899 births
1995 deaths
Ambassadors of Italy to Spain
Ambassadors of Italy to Romania
Ambassadors of Italy to Egypt
Italian occupation of Greece during World War II
Grand Crosses with Star and Sash of the Order of Merit of the Federal Republic of Germany
Italian diplomats
20th-century diplomats